Studenci may refer to:
 Studenci, Ljubuški, a village in Bosnia and Herzegovina
 Studenci, Nevesinje, a village in Bosnia and Herzegovina
 Studenci, Teslić, a village in Bosnia and Herzegovina
 Studenci, Maribor, a village in Slovenia
 Studenci, Croatia, a village near Perušić